Iván León But (born 19 January 1996) is a Chilean badminton player. In 2015, he competed at the Pan American Games in Toronto, Canada. In 2016, he became the men's doubles runner-up at the Chile International tournament partnered with Bastián Lizama and the champion in the mixed doubles event with Camila Macaya. He also won two bronze medals at the 2016 Pan Am Badminton Championships in the men's singles and doubles event. He clinched three bronze medals at the 2018 South American Games in the men's doubles, mixed doubles and team event.

Achievements

Pan Am Championships 
Men's singles

Men's doubles

South American Games 
Men's doubles

Mixed doubles

BWF International Challenge/Series 
Men's doubles

Mixed doubles

  BWF International Challenge tournament
  BWF International Series tournament
  BWF Future Series tournament

References

External links 

 

Living people
1996 births
Chilean male badminton players
Badminton players at the 2015 Pan American Games
Badminton players at the 2019 Pan American Games
Pan American Games competitors for Chile
Competitors at the 2018 South American Games
South American Games bronze medalists for Chile
South American Games medalists in badminton
21st-century Chilean people